Turza may refer to the following places:
Turza, Greater Poland Voivodeship (west-central Poland)
Turza, Lesser Poland Voivodeship (south Poland)
Turza, Subcarpathian Voivodeship (south-east Poland)
Turza, Lubliniec County in Silesian Voivodeship (south Poland)
Turza, Zawiercie County in Silesian Voivodeship (south Poland)
Turza, Opole Voivodeship (south-west Poland)
Turza, La Rioja (a village in La Rioja, Spain)